The affinity laws (also known as the "Fan Laws" or "Pump Laws") for pumps/fans are used in hydraulics, hydronics and/or HVAC to express the relationship between variables involved in pump or fan performance (such as head, volumetric flow rate, shaft speed) and power. They apply to pumps, fans, and hydraulic turbines. In these rotary implements, the affinity laws apply both to centrifugal and axial flows.

The laws are derived using the Buckingham π theorem. The affinity laws are useful as they allow prediction of the head discharge characteristic of a pump or fan from a known characteristic measured at a different speed or impeller diameter. The only requirement is that the two pumps or fans are dynamically similar, that is, the ratios of the fluid forced are the same. It is also required that the two impellers' speed or diameter are running at the same efficiency.

Law 1. With impeller diameter (D) held constant:

Law 1a. Flow is proportional to shaft speed: 

 
Law 1b. Pressure or Head is proportional to the square of shaft speed:
 

Law 1c. Power is proportional to the cube of shaft speed:
 

Law 2. With shaft speed (N) held constant: 

Law 2a. Flow is proportional to the impeller diameter: 

 
Law 2b. Pressure or Head is proportional to the square of the impeller diameter:
 

Law 2c. Power is proportional to the cube of the impeller diameter (assuming constant shaft speed):

where 
  is the volumetric flow rate (e.g. CFM, GPM or L/s)
  is the impeller diameter (e.g. in or mm)
  is the shaft rotational speed (e.g. rpm)
  is the pressure or head developed by the fan/pump (e.g. psi or Pascal)
  is the shaft power (e.g. W).

These laws assume that the pump/fan efficiency remains constant i.e. , which is rarely exactly true, but can be a good approximation when used over appropriate frequency or diameter ranges (i.e., a fan will not move anywhere near 1000 times as much air when spun at 1000 times its designed operating speed, but the air movement may be increased by 99% when the operating speed is only doubled).  The exact relationship between speed, diameter, and efficiency depends on the particulars of the individual fan or pump design. Product testing or computational fluid dynamics become necessary if the range of acceptability is unknown, or if a high level of accuracy is required in the calculation.  Interpolation from accurate data is also more accurate than the affinity laws.  When applied to pumps, the laws work well for constant diameter variable speed case (Law 1) but are less accurate for constant speed variable impeller diameter case (Law 2).

For radial flow centrifugal pumps, it is common industry practice to reduce the impeller diameter by "trimming", whereby the outer diameter of a particular impeller is reduced by machining to alter the performance of the pump. In this particular industry it is also common to refer to the mathematical approximations that relate the volumetric flow rate, trimmed impeller diameter, shaft rotational speed, developed head, and power as the "affinity laws". Because trimming an impeller changes the fundamental shape of the impeller (increasing the specific speed), the relationships shown in Law 2 cannot be utilized in this scenario. In this case, the industry looks to the following relationships, which is a better approximation of these variables when dealing with impeller trimming.

With shaft speed (N) held constant and for small variations in impeller diameter via trimming: 

The volumetric flow rate varies directly with the trimmed impeller diameter:

 
The pump developed head (the total dynamic head) varies to the square of the trimmed impeller diameter:
 

The power varies to the cube of the trimmed impeller diameter:

where 
  is the volumetric flow rate (e.g. CFM, GPM or L/s)
  is the impeller diameter (e.g. in or mm)
  is the shaft rotational speed (e.g. rpm)
  is the total dynamic head developed by the pump (e.g. m or ft)
  is the shaft power (e.g. W or HP)

See also

 Centripetal force

References

Hydraulics
Pumps
Ventilation fans
Turbines